The 1992 FIBA Europe Under-20 Championship (known at that time as 1992 European Championship for Men 'Under22 and Under') was the first edition of the FIBA Europe Under-20 Championship. The city of Athens, in Greece, hosted the tournament. Italy won their first title.

Teams

Squads

Preliminary round
The twelve teams were allocated in two groups of six teams each.

Group A

Group B

Knockout stage

9th–12th playoffs

5th–8th playoffs

Championship

Final standings

References
FIBA Archive
FIBA Europe Archive

FIBA U20 European Championship
1992–93 in European basketball
1992–93 in Greek basketball
International youth basketball competitions hosted by Greece